The Unforgettable Memory is a Taiwanese prime-time television series, originally broadcast on Formosa Television from 22 September 2004 to 28 September 2006 for 526 episodes. With a run-time of over 50,000 minutes, it is the longest Taiwanese TV drama in the 21st century.

Cast 
Wang Shengtian is the main protagonist in this drama. Villains include Huang Kunshan, Cai Jinpao, Du Wenjie, Wu Pinde and many others.

Wangs

Lais

Huangs

Lis and Sus

Fangs

Lins

Cais

Lins

Mais

Dus

Lis

Lis (not again)

Chens

Xus

Tiancheng Enterprise

Tianying Enterprise

Tianlei Enterprise

Music

Theme Song

Ending  Songs

Viewership in Taiwan 
The Unforgettable Memory has the distinction of being the longest primetime drama ever in Taiwan history, with a total of 526 episodes produced. It has the highest viewership of all TV shows in Taiwan when it debuted at primetime on September 22, 2004 till its ending on September 28, 2006 almost daily (hitting above 10). It was rerun again at 6.00–7.00 pm from July 5, 2010 and lasted until 2014.

Overseas reception 
The series received very good critical response and viewership in other countries too and as of 2009 being shown in Singapore's MediaCorp Channel 8 (in weekday one hour series from June 9, 2006 to October 23, 2009, 4.30–5.30 pm, becoming the longest running drama on Channel 8 in 46 years) rerunning in the pre-dawn hours from Tuesdays to Saturdays 4.00–6.00 am from January 7, 2009 to September 9, 2010, and the third time from 4 October 2010 from Mondays to Thursdays at 10.00 am – 12.00 noon and ended in 2012. Singapore's Channel 8, China's CCTV-8 and Hong Kong's ATV Channel all aired with each episode running 1 hour, with a total of 872 episodes. It has ended its run on Malaysia's Astro Cable Service. The Vietnamese dub "Tình Đầu Khó Phai" was broadcast on THVL Channel and is streamable on YouTube with a total of 767 episodes.

International broadcast

Taiwan broadcast
, the show airs in Taiwan, country of origin of the drama every weeknight at prime time (20:00) with episodes which have ranged in length from 135 to 150 minutes including commercial advertisements.  The producers received funding from the Government Information Office to produce the series in high definition. The encore episodes are currently uploading on Formosa Television Drama's Youtube Page.

References

External links 
Main Portal Site at Formosa Television
Episode Synopses and Reviews at Sina
CCTV Portal Site at CCTV
Discussion at Baidu

Articles
526集超长台剧登陆央视

2004 Taiwanese television series debuts
2006 Taiwanese television series endings
Formosa Television original programming
Taiwanese drama television series
Television shows set in Taiwan
Hokkien-language television shows